Congregation Beth Emeth (House of Truth) is a Reform synagogue in Albany, New York. Congregation Beth Emeth is also the fourth oldest reform synagogue in the United States

History

The congregation was formed in 1885 with the merger of a "dwindling" Orthodox congregation, Anshe Emeth (People of Truth) and a "growing" Reform congregation, Beth El (House of God). Reform pioneer Rabbi Isaac Mayer Wise led Beth El from 1846 to 1850 where he conducted a day school which included public school curriculum, religion & Hebrew. Due to tensions between more orthodox congregants and the Rabbi, Anshe Emeth (People of Truth) was created by Rabbi Wise supporters where he then led from 1850 to 1854 before relocating to Cincinnati.

In 1897 the newly merged congregation elected Dr. Max Schlesinger as the new Rabbi.

Martin A. Meyer served as rabbi from 1902 to 1906, and Samuel H. Goldenson served as rabbi from 1906 to 1918. After Rabbi Samuel the congregation was led by Rabbi Eli Mayer, Rabbi Marius Ranson, Rabbi Bernard J. Bamberger, Rabbi Samuel Wolk, Rabbi Alvin S. Roth, Rabbi Silverman and most recently Rabbi Scott Shpeen.

Architecture

The congregation's 1887 building, located at Lancaster and South Swan Streets in Albany, is considered to be one of the few surviving 19th-century synagogues in the United States.  The architect was Adolph Fleischman, with Isaac Perry. The building is in Richardson Romanesque style. As of 1993 it was the home of the Wilborn Temple First Church of God in Christ.

In June of 1953 the building committee ratified the decision to move from Lancaster & Swan to 17 acres up town.  The congregation's 1957 building was designed by Percival Goodman.

References

External links
Congregation Beth Emeth website

Synagogues completed in 1887
Buildings and structures in Albany, New York
Reform synagogues in New York (state)
Romanesque Revival synagogues
Romanesque Revival architecture in New York (state)
Percival Goodman synagogues
Synagogues completed in 1957
1885 establishments in New York (state)
Religious organizations established in 1885